The 3rd Utah State Legislature was elected Tuesday, November 8, 1898, and convened on Monday, January 9, 1899.

Dates of sessions
 1899 Biennial Session: January 9, 1899

Utah Senate

Members

Utah House of Representatives

Members

See also
 List of Utah state legislatures

Legislature
3
1898 in Utah
1899 in Utah

References